The Bamboos were a swamp and alternative rock band from Collie, Western Australia which formed in 1984 by mainstays Mark Gelmi on bass guitar and Craig Hallsworth on guitar and vocals. They relocated to Perth by the following year and were joined by Greg Hitchcock (ex-The Go-Starts, Graverobbers) on guitar, and by Shakir Pichler (ex-The Kryptonics) on drums in 1986 who was replaced by Russell Hopkinson in the next year. The Bamboos released an album, Rarer than Rockinghorse Shit and an EP, Born Killer, before they disbanded in late 1987.

History

The line-up was Tony Chiallella on drums; Mark Gelmi on bass guitar; Craig Hallsworth on guitar and vocals; and Roger Russell on guitar. By 1985 they had relocated to the capital where Russell was replaced by Greg Hitchcock (ex-The Go-Starts, Graverobbers) on guitar. This line-up recorded three tracks for a 6× extended play box set, Cooking with George – Mark Too, with Ian Davis producing at Australian Broadcasting Corporation Studio 621 in Perth.

In 1986 Chiallella was replaced by Shakir Pichler (ex-The Kryptonics) on drums. According to Australian musicologist, Ian McFarlane, the group performed "raw guitar trash and country-swamp rock [which] caught the attention of Citadel Records boss John Needham". In September they released a single, "Snuff", on Citadel. A cassette album, Rarer Than Rockinghorse Shit, followed on Cleopatra Records in the same year. Another single, "Dead Girl", was succeeded in May next year by a six-track EP, Born Killer, on Citadel.

After two national tours Pichler left to form his own rockabilly band, The Howlin MoonDoggies, and was replaced by Russell Hopkinson (ex-Vicious Circle). They issued their final single, "With Which to Love You", in October 1987 and then disbanded. During their career The Bamboos supported Lime Spiders, Johnny Thunders, The Dammed, Nick Cave and the Bad Seeds, The Johnnys, Hoodoo Gurus, Violent Femmes and The Cramps.

Afterwards 

After disbanding ex-members of The Bamboos joined other groups. Hallsworth formed The Healers, Wild Palms, Zuvuya, Outstation, Tangled Star and The Slow Beings. In 2016 Craig released a solo album - What's The Story With This Hole? through Hidden Shoal. This is available for digital download. In 2019/20 Craig reunited with Jim Butterworth on bass (The Healers, Outstation, Zuvuya, Wild Palms and Tangled Star) and they enlisted Michael Newman on drums to form magnets have souls. Hitchcock has been associated with The Neptunes, The Kryptonics, New Christs, The Verys, Challenger 7, You Am I, The Dearhunters, and The Monarchs. Hopkinson joined Nursery Crimes and then You Am I. Hopkinson has also worked with Australian punk act, Radio Birdman, and managed a record label and distribution company, Reverberation Records from 2003 to August 2007, when it was taken over by Fuse Music Group. Pichler formed The Howlin MoonDoggies, Fink, Brutal Pancho and toured with Amphetish and United States band, Wish You Weres. Pichler also established his own label, Sexbeat Records, and appeared in feature films, Mission: Impossible 2, On Our Selection, and Fat Pizza: The Movie; and a TV series, Nightmares and Dreamscapes: From the Stories of Stephen King.

Members 

 Tony Chiallella: drums (1984–86)
 Mark Gelmi: bass (1984–87)
 Craig Hallsworth: guitar, vocals (1984–87)
 Greg Hitchcock: vocals, guitar (1985–87)
 Russell Hopkinson: drums (1986–87)
 Shakir Pichler: drums (1986)
 Roger Russell: guitar (1984–85)

Discography

Albums 

 Bamboos/Mutants of Desire (Cassette) – independent release (1985)
 Born Killer (EP) – Citadel Records (1987) (AUS No. 94)
 Rarer Than Rockinghorse Shit – Cleopatra (1987)

Singles 

 "Snuff" / "Virginia" – Citadel (1986)
 "With Which to Love You" / "Winded" – Citadel (1986)
 "Dead Girl" (free limited flexi-disc)

Contributions 

Cooking with George – ABC (1985): "Law of a Gun", "Gone Wishin'", "Virginia"
Positively Elisabeth Street – Citadel (1989): "With Which to Love You" Closer Records (France), Normal Records (Germany)
Tales from the Australian Underground: Singles 1976–1989 – Feel Presents Pty (2004): "With Which to Love You"

References 

Australian alternative rock groups
Musical groups established in 1984
Musical groups disestablished in 1987
Western Australian musical groups
1984 establishments in Australia